Thomas Leo "Ted" St. Germaine (February 2, 1885 – October 4, 1947) was an American football player, coach, and lawyer.  He served as the head football coach at Villanova College—now known as Villanova University—for one season, in 1913, compiling a record of 4–2–1.  Germaine played professionally in the National Football League (NFL) during the 1922 season. That season, he joined the NFL's Oorang Indians, a team based in LaRue, Ohio, which was composed solely of Native Americans, and coached by Jim Thorpe. St, Germaine was qualified to play for the Indians since he was a Chippewa.

Germaine attended the University of Wisconsin, but found the atmosphere more friendly at Carlisle Indian Industrial School, located in Pennsylvania, where he played football and earned his bachelor's degree. He then furthered his education at Howard University and Yale Law School where, in 1913, he acquired a law degree. However even with a degree from Yale, St. Germaine knew that he was more likely to find a job on an Indian college coaching staff than in a white lawyer's office. He was recruited to play for the Oorang Indians, in 1922, at the age of 37, by Jim Thorpe. He is believed to have been the first attorney at law to play for an NFL team.

After his football career ended, St. Germaine became a tribal judge and, in 1932, was the first Native-American admitted to the bar in Wisconsin. When President Franklin Roosevelt ended the Native-American assimilation policies, St. Germaine served as the spokesman for the Lac du Flambeau delegation at the Hayward, Wisconsin, hearings. At these hearings, St. Germaine argued for Indian self-government and tribal control of natural resources as stipulated in the treaties of the 19th century. Some of these concepts were incorporated into the Indian Reorganization Act of 1934.  Germaine died of a heart attack in 1947.

Head coaching record

References

1885 births
1947 deaths
American football centers
American football guards
American football tackles
Carlisle Indians football players
Oorang Indians players
Villanova Wildcats football coaches
Haskell Indian Nations University alumni
Howard University alumni
University of Wisconsin–Madison alumni
Yale Law School alumni
Players of American football from Wisconsin
Wisconsin lawyers
People from Lac du Flambeau, Wisconsin
Ojibwe people
Native American sportspeople
20th-century American lawyers